This article is about the competition in soccer.

Results

Rosters

Sapperton Rovers

Ottawa St. Anthony

Calgary Callies

References

https://web.archive.org/web/20100924214531/http://canadasoccer.com/documents/2009_CCC_byLabrom.pdf

Canadian National Challenge Cup
Canadian
Nat